John Alexander Kneubuhl (July 2, 1920 – February 20, 1992) was an American Samoan screenwriter, playwright and Polynesian historian. He wrote for American television series such as The Fugitive, Gunsmoke, The Wild Wild West, Star Trek, The Invaders and Hawaii Five-O. The son of a Samoan mother and an American father, Kneubuhl's multicultural heritage produced a distinctive artistic vision that formed the basis of his most powerful dramatic work.

An accomplished playwright, Kneubuhl "was a bicultural Polynesian who used the medium of theater to explore identity, loneliness and the craft required to bring them to the stage".

Biography
John Alexander Kneubuhl was born in Fagatogo, Pago Pago or the village of Leone, in American Samoa.

John Kneubuhl is the uncle of Samoan Hawaiian writer Victoria Nalani Kneubuhl and Lemanatele Mark Kneubuhl who lives in American Samoa.

Childhood to war 
Raised in Leone until his early teens, Kneubuhl was known as 'Sione Nupo' to his countrymen. His mother, Atalina Pritchard from Apia, was educated in New Zealand, and was a talented pianist, singer and painter. His father Benjamin F. Kneubuhl was a navy surveyor from Iowa who settled in Samoa, and later became a successful businessman.

At the age of 13, John Kneubuhl was sent off to enter Punahou School, Hawaii. He later studied under Thornton Wilder at Yale.

He married "Dotsy" (Dorothy Schenk) in 1942, and soon after entered the U.S. Navy Japanese Language School at the University of Colorado, Boulder. When George H. Kerr was tasked to organize the second research unit of intelligence officers in 1944, aimed to gather information for compiling the Civil Affairs Handbook for Taiwan (Formosa), Kneubuhl was one of the officers recruited into this unit.

Career 
Returning to Hawaii in the mid-1940s, Kneubuhl won acclaim as a playwright with the Honolulu Community Theater, staging a play spoken in Hawaiian Pidgin English (The City is Haunted, 1947). Kneubuhl was also part of the theater's 1948 version of Harry Brown's A Sound of Hunting adapted to include the heroic role played by the 442nd Infantry Regiment of enlisted nisei, received with great fervor by the Japanese-American community. He was both screenwriter and director of the film Damien (1959), a biography of Father Damien that was based on his own play.

He then moved on to Los Angeles to write for television. In 1965, inspired by a magazine article on Michael Dunn, Kneubuhl created the arch-villain Dr. Miguelito Loveless for the series The Wild Wild West. The character became an immediate hit and Dunn appeared in ten episodes over four seasons. Kneubuhl wrote five of them.

Twenty years later he was back in Samoa, lecturing on Polynesian history and culture and writing plays, including the trilogy Think of a Garden: and other plays published by University of Hawaii Press. The other plays in the published trilogy were Mele Kanikau: A Pageant and the comedy A Play: A Play.

Kneubuhl died in Pago Pago, American Samoa, on February 20, 1992, the day before the first Samoan reading of his play "Think of a Garden" by his drama and writing group.

Playwright
Kneubuhl's plays explore his Samoan heritage, culture and identity. In 1946, Kneubuhl wrote the play The Harp in the Willows based on the life of Lorenzo Lyons and This City Is Haunted (1947). He also wrote Mele Kanikau: A Pageant and the comedy A Play: A Play.

Think of a Garden, the last play Kneubuhl wrote before his death in 1992, has been called the most Samoan of Kneubuhl's plays, it is a candid look at the writer's bicultural upbringing that artfully weaves together family memory, history, and mysticism.

Think of a Garden notes
Think of a Garden opens in American Samoa in 1929 during the tumultuous colonial era of Samoa's struggle for political independence during the non-violent Mau movement. The play centres around the Kreber family; a matriarchal Samoan wife Luisa, her American husband Frank, and their only son David. Events unfold to a dramatic climax with the shooting in Apia of Samoa's leader, Tupua Tamasese Lealofi III, a distant relative of Luisa, by the New Zealand constabulary. The play is partly autobiographical. Kneubuhl's play is a devastating critique of the New Zealand administration's mismanagement of Samoa during these events.

The Samoan view of family, deference for the dead, behavior in times of mourning, even concepts of time - all are deftly etched beside the story of Samoa's early move toward independence. The effect is a story as textured as a fine mat.

Think of a Garden premiered at Auckland's Watershed Theatre in February 1993. John had died a year earlier, the day before the play's first reading in Pago Pago by his writing and drama group. The Auckland premier was directed by Nathaniel Lees and produced by Ann Andrews. The cast included Lani Tupu as The Writer, Jay Laga'aia as Lilo, Martyn Sanderson as the Brother Patrick and John Callen as Frank.  It was staged in Taki Rua Theatre, Wellington in 1995. At the Chapman Tripp Theatre Awards 1995 in Wellington, the 'Oscars' of New Zealand theatre, Think of a Garden won Production of the Year, Director of the Year, Taki Rua Production of the Year and Female in a Supporting Role award to Sima Urale who played the role of Luisa. The cast included acclaimed New Zealand actor Martyn Sanderson, the director of the film Flying Fox in a Freedom Tree based on the novel by Samoan writer Albert Wendt.

It was staged in 2018 in the garden of Nathan Homestead in Manurewa directed by Anapela Polata'ivao and featuring Stacey Leilua who saw the premier when she was 11.

Explanatory notes

Filmography

Films

Television

References
Citations

Bibliography

External links
Native American Authors site

Hawaii University Press
Pacific Islands Writing book by Michelle Keown at Google Books
 

1920 births
1992 deaths
American Samoan male actors
American Samoan artists
American Samoan dramatists and playwrights
American Samoan screenwriters
Historians of Polynesia
20th-century American male actors
20th-century American dramatists and playwrights
20th-century American historians
20th-century screenwriters
United States Navy personnel of World War II